Lopesi Faagu (born 8 April 1960) is a weightlifter from American Samoa.

Faagu competed at the 1988 Summer Olympics in the light-heavyweight class, he finished 18th out of the 22 starters.

References

External links
 

1960 births
Living people
American Samoan male weightlifters
American people of Samoan descent
Olympic weightlifters of American Samoa
Weightlifters at the 1988 Summer Olympics